The 2020–21 Oklahoma City Thunder season was the 13th season of the franchise in Oklahoma City and the 55th in the National Basketball Association (NBA). This is the first season since 2014–15 without head coach Billy Donovan, as he mutually agreed to part ways with the Thunder on September 8, 2020, and 14 days later, went on to become the new head coach of the Chicago Bulls. For the first time since 2012–13, long-time players Steven Adams and André Roberson were not on the roster, as Adams was traded to the New Orleans Pelicans, and Roberson signed with the Brooklyn Nets.

On November 11, the Thunder promoted assistant and former Oklahoma City Blue coach Mark Daigneault as their new head coach. At the age of 35, Daigneault is currently the youngest active head coach in the NBA, after the Minnesota Timberwolves fired third-year head coach Ryan Saunders on February 21, 2021.

The 2020–21 season was the team's first time since 2014–15 missing the playoffs and their first losing season since 2008–09, the team's inaugural season in Oklahoma City. It was also the fourth time under Sam Presti's tenure that the team had missed the playoffs. Power forward Al Horford, who was acquired by the Thunder via trade on December 8, 2020, also missed the playoffs for the first time in his 14-year career.

Previous season
The Thunder finished the 2019–20 season 44–28 to finish in second place in the Northwest Division, fifth in the Western Conference and qualified for the playoffs. The season was suspended by the league officials following the games of March 11 after it was reported that Rudy Gobert tested positive for COVID-19. The Thunder were one of the 22 teams invited to the NBA Bubble on June 4.

The Thunder faced the Houston Rockets in the first round however lost in a decisive game 7.

Offseason

Draft Picks

The Thunder had one first-round pick and one second-round pick entering the draft. The Thunder's own first-round pick was conveyed to the Philadelphia 76ers in the Jerami Grant trade back in 2016. The pick was top-20 protected and was conveyed when Mike Muscala hit a game winner against the Miami Heat in the 2019-20 season. The Thunder acquired a first-round pick from the Denver Nuggets in the Jerami Grant trade back in 2020.

On draft night, the Thunder traded the draft rights to Cassius Winston, the 53rd pick, and a 2024 second-round pick to the Washington Wizards in exchange for Admiral Schofield and the draft rights to Vít Krejčí, the 37th pick. The Thunder also acquired the draft rights to Jaden McDaniels, the 28th pick, and Danny Green in the Dennis Schroder.

Two days later, the Thunder traded the draft rights to Immanuel Quickley, the 25th pick, to the New York Knicks, and the draft rights to Jaden McDaniels, the 28th pick, to the Minnesota Timberwolves in a three-team trade where the Thunder acquired the draft rights to Aleksej Pokuševski, the 17th pick, James Johnson, and a 2024 second-round pick via MIN. On December 8, the Thunder acquired the draft rights to Théo Maledon, the 34th pick, draft rights to Vasilije Micić, Al Horford and a 2025 first-round pick from the Philadelphia 76ers.

The Thunder, after the 2020 NBA Draft night and the conclusion of player acquisitions and transactions, ended with Olympiacos forward Aleksej Pokuševski, ASVEL Villerbaunne guard Théo Maledon, and Casademont Zaragoza guard Vít Krejčí.

Trades

The Thunder started this offseason to reposition and rebuild for the future after a surprising 2019-20 season that saw a playoff appearance following the trades of Russell Westbrook and Paul George.

On November 16, the Thunder traded All-Star Chris Paul and Abdel Nader to the Phoenix Suns in exchange for Ty Jerome, Jalen Lecque, Kelly Oubre Jr., Ricky Rubio and a 2022 first-round pick. Paul had a resurgent season during the 2019-20 season, reclaiming his reputation as "Point God," taking the Thunder to a surprising playoff appearance in the 2020 NBA Playoffs. The Thunder began the season with a "0.2%" chance to make the playoffs prior to the start of the season. Paul was named an All-Star  and was named to All-NBA Second Team for the first time since 2016. Sam Presti worked with Paul's representatives at CAA to allow Paul to his preferred destination.

On draft night November 18, the Thunder traded Dennis Schröder to the Los Angeles Lakers in exchange for Danny Green and the draft rights to Jaden McDaniels, the twenty-eighth pick. Schröder led the league in points scored off the bench and finished second in NBA Sixth Man of the Year voting. A day later on November 19, the Thunder traded a protected 2021 second-round pick to the Boston Celtics in exchange for Vincent Poirier in an effort to use his salary in a bigger trade. The same day, the Thunder traded the draft rights to Cassius Winston, the fifty-third pick, and a 2024 second-round pick to the Washington Wizards in exchange for the draft rights to Vít Krejčí and Admiral Schofield. On December 18, the Thunder waived Admiral Schofield. Two days later on November 20, the Thunder traded the draft rights to Jaden McDaniels and Ricky Rubio to the Minnesota Timberwolves in a three team trade, for the draft rights to Aleksej Pokuševski, the seventeenth pick, James Johnson and a 2024 second-round pick. The Thunder also traded the draft rights to Immanuel Quickley, the twenty-fifth pick, to the New York Knicks as part of the three team trade.

On November 22, the Thunder traded Kelly Oubre Jr., originally acquired from the Suns, to the Golden State Warriors in exchange for a protected 2021 first-round pick and a 2021 second-round pick via DEN. The first-round pick acquired was top-20 protected by Golden State and will be converted into two second-round picks if not conveyed.

On November 24, the Thunder traded Steven Adams to the New Orleans Pelicans in a four team trade, for George Hill from Milwaukee, Zylan Cheatham from New Orleans, Josh Gray from New Orleans, Darius Miller from New Orleans, Kenrich Williams from New Orleans, a 2023 first-round pick from Denver, a 2023 second-round pick (via WAS) from New Orleans and a 2024 second-round pick (via CHA) from New Orleans. The Thunder also generated a trade exception worth $27.5 million, the largest in NBA history to date. Adams was the longest tenured player on the roster since being drafted back in 2013. On December 1 and December 2, the Thunder waived Josh Gray and Zylan Cheatham. The same day on November 24, the Thunder signed-and-traded Danilo Gallinari and cash considerations to the Atlanta Hawks in exchange for a protected 2025 second-round pick while generating another trade exception worth $19.5 million.

On November 25, the Thunder traded Jalen Lecque, originally acquired from the Suns, to the Indiana Pacers in exchange for T.J. Leaf and a 2027 second-round pick. On December 18, the Thunder waived T.J. Leaf. On November 27, the Thunder traded James Johnson, originally acquired from the Timberwolves in a three team trade, for Trevor Ariza from Detroit, Justin Jackson from Dallas, a 2023 second-round pick (best of DAL or MIA) from Dallas and a 2026 second-round pick from Dallas. Ariza would never report to the Thunder while attending to personal issues that kept him out of the 2020 NBA Playoffs.

On December 8, the Thunder traded Terrance Ferguson, Danny Green, originally acquired from the Lakers, and Vincent Poirier, originally acquired from the Celtics to the Philadelphia 76ers in exchange for Al Horford, the draft rights to Théo Maledon, the thirty-fourth pick, the draft rights to Vasilije Micić, the fifty-second pick in the 2014 NBA Draft, and a 2025 first-round pick. Horford, who signed a four-year, $109 million deal, did not fit with Joel Embiid saw his role diminished and was eventually removed from the starting lineup. Micic was a second-round pick in 2014 was named to a second-team All-EuroLeague selection in 2019.

At the end of offseason, the Thunder accumulated 17 first-round picks through the 2026 NBA draft.

Free agency

For this offseason, free agency began on November 20, 2020, while the moratorium ended on November 22. Deonte Burton, Danilo Gallinari, Devon Hall, Kevin Hervey, Nerlens Noel and Andre Roberson were set to hit free agency. On September 21, Kevin Hervey signed a contract with the  Russian team Lokomotiv Kuban of the VTB United League. Hervey was originally set to reach free agency in fall but the Thunder let him out of his contract early to  be lined up with an international team. On November 20, it was reported that Danilo Gallinari agreed to a three-year, $61.5 million deal with the Atlanta Hawks, which he later signed on November 24. The Thunder negotiated a sign-and-trade deal to acquire a protected 2025 second-round pick and generating a trade exception. On November 21, it was reported that Nerlens Noel agreed to a one-year contract with the New York Knicks, which he lated signed on November 25. Burton, Hall and Roberson who were not re-signed, joined the Maine Celtics of the NBA G League, Brose Bamberg and the Brooklyn Nets respectively.

On December 9, Moses Brown and Josh Hall both signed a two-way contract with the Thunder, splitting time with the Thunder and the Oklahoma City Blue. Brown spent the 2019-20 season with the Portland Trail Blazers. Hall came undrafted out of Moravian Prep high school out of Hudson, North Carolina.

Front office and coaching changes
After the Thunder's defeat in the 2020 NBA Playoffs, head coach Billy Donovan and the Thunder mutually agreed to part ways on September 8, 2020, after five seasons with the team. Donovan was named head coach of the Thunder on April 30, 2015, taking over for Scott Brooks after the 2014-15 season. Donovan accumulated a 243-157 (.608) record with playoff appearances in each season, including a trip to the Western Conference Finals during the 2016 NBA Playoffs. Donovan was also named co-recipient of the 2020 NBCA Coach of the Year.

On November 11, the Thunder hired Mark Daigneault, an assistant since last season, as head coach. Daigneault became the fourth head coach of the Thunder since moving to Oklahoma City. Daigneault spent five seasons as the head coach of the Oklahoma City Blue accumulating three consecutive division titles and four playoff appearances including a franchise-record 34 wins.

On November 25, the Thunder announced Mike Wilks, Dave Bliss, David Akinyooye, Mike Miller as assistant coaches and Zach Peterson and Kameron Woods as player development coaches. Miller joins the Thunder after serving as interim head coach of the New York Knicks. Woods joins the Thunder after serving two seasons as an assistant coach for the Oklahoma City Blue.

Roster

Standings

Conference

Division

Game log

Preseason

|- style="background:#cfc;"
| 1
| December 12
| @ San Antonio 
| 
| Theo Maledon (20)
| Isaiah Roby (11)
| Shai Gilgeous-Alexander (4)
| AT&T Center No In-Person Attendance
| 1–0
|- style="background:#fcc;"
| 2
| December 16
| Chicago 
| 
| Horford & Jackson (15)
| Al Horford (7)
| Gilgeous-Alexander & Roby (3)
| Chesapeake Energy Arena No In-Person Attendance
| 1–1
|- style="background:#fcc;"
| 3
| December 18
| Chicago
| 
| Al Horford (17)
| Aleksej Pokuševski (13)
| Shai Gilgeous-Alexander (5)
| Chesapeake Energy ArenaNo In-Person Attendance
| 1–2

Regular season

|-style="background:#cccc;"
| -
| December 23
| @ Houston
| colspan="6" | Postponed (COVID-19) (Makeup date: March 21)
|-style="background:#cfc;"
| 1
| December 26
| @ Charlotte
| 
| Shai Gilgeous-Alexander (24)
| Al Horford (13)
| Shai Gilgeous-Alexander (9)
| Spectrum Center0
| 1–0
|-style="background:#fbb;"
| 2
| December 28
| Utah
| 
| Luguentz Dort (26)
| Darius Bazley (11)
| Shai Gilgeous-Alexander (7)
| Chesapeake Energy Arena0
| 1–1
|-style="background:#fbb;"
| 3
| December 29
| Orlando
| 
| Shai Gilgeous-Alexander (23)
| Hamidou Diallo (8)
| Shai Gilgeous-Alexander (7)
| Chesapeake Energy Arena0
| 1–2
|- style="background:#fbb;"
| 4
| December 31
| New Orleans
| 
| Al Horford (17)
| Roby & Al Horford (6)
| Gilgeous-Alexander, Hill & Pokusevski (4)
| Chesapeake Energy Arena0
| 1–3

|-style="background:#cfc;"
| 5
| January 2
| @ Orlando
| 
| Darius Bazley (19)
| Darius Bazley (12)
| Shai Gilgeous-Alexander (7)
| Amway Center3,339
| 2–3
|-style="background:#fcc;"
| 6
| January 4
| @ Miami
| 
| Shai Gilgeous-Alexander (18)
| Darius Bazley (8)
| Shai Gilgeous-Alexander (4)
| American Airlines Arena0
| 2–4
|-style="background:#cfc;"
| 7
| January 6
| @ New Orleans
| 
| Shai Gilgeous-Alexander (21)
| Darius Bazley (12)
| Shai Gilgeous-Alexander (9)
| Smoothie King CenterLimited Seating
| 3–4
|-style="background:#cfc;"
| 8
| January 8
| @ New York
| 
| Shai Gilgeous-Alexander (25)
| Hamidou Diallo (11)
| Shai Gilgeous-Alexander (7)
| Madison Square Garden0
| 4–4
|-style="background:#cfc;"
| 9
| January 10
| @ Brooklyn
| 
| Shai Gilgeous-Alexander (31)
| Gilgeous-Alexander, Horford (6)
| Shai Gilgeous-Alexander (7)
| Barclays Center0
| 5–4
|-style="background:#fcc;"
| 10
| January 12
| San Antonio
| 
| Shai Gilgeous-Alexander (20)
| Shai Gilgeous-Alexander (9)
| George Hill (5)
| Chesapeake Energy Arena0
| 5–5
|-style="background:#fcc;"
| 11
| January 13
| L. A. Lakers
| 
| Shai Gilgeous-Alexander (17)
| Isaiah Roby (9)
| Maledon, Roby, Williams (4)
| Chesapeake Energy Arena0
| 5–6
|-style="background:#cfc;"
| 12
| January 15
| Chicago
| 
| Shai Gilgeous-Alexander (33)
| Luguentz Dort (8)
| Shai Gilgeous-Alexander (10)
| Chesapeake Energy Arena0
| 6–6
|-style="background:#ccc;"
| -
| January 17
| Philadelphia
| colspan="6" | Postponed (COVID-19) (Makeup date: April 10)
|-style="background:#fcc;"
| 13
| January 19
| @ Denver
| 
| Luguentz Dort (20)
| Isaiah Roby (9)
| Shai Gilgeous-Alexander (7)
| Ball Arena0
| 6–7
|-style="background:#fcc;"
| 14
| January 22
| @ L. A. Clippers
| 
| Shai Gilgeous-Alexander (30)
| Maledon & Hill (5)
|Shai Gilgeous-Alexander (8)
| Staples Center 0
| 6–8
|-style="background:#fcc;"
| 15
| January 24
| @ L. A. Clippers
| 
| Shai Gilgeous-Alexander (23)
| Darius Bazley (11)
| Shai Gilgeous-Alexander (11)
| Staples Center0
| 6–9
|-style="background:#cfc;"
| 16
| January 25
| @ Portland
| 
| Shai Gilgeous-Alexander (24)
| Shai Gilgeous-Alexander (9)
|Shai Gilgeous-Alexander (6)
| Moda Center0
| 7–9
|-style="background:#cfc;"
| 17
| January 27
| @ Phoenix
| 
| Horford & Gilgeous-Alexander (21)
| Al Horford (11)
| Shai Gilgeous-Alexander (8)
| PHX Arena0
| 8–9
|-style="background:#fcc;"
| 18
| January 29
| Brooklyn
| 
| Gilgeous-Alexander & Maledon (24)
| Al Horford (6)
| Shai Gilgeous-Alexander (5)
| Chesapeake Energy Arena0
| 8–10

|-style="background:#fcc;"
| 19
| February 1
| Houston
| 
| Shai Gilgeous-Alexander (19)
| Al Horford (7)
| Shai Gilgeous-Alexander (5)
| Chesapeake Energy Arena0
| 8–11
|-style="background:#cfc;"
| 20
| February 3
| Houston
| 
| Kenrich Williams (19)
| Darius Bazley (12)
| Theo Maledon (4)
| Chesapeake Energy Arena0
| 9–11
|-style="background:#fcc;"
| 21
| February 5
| Minnesota
| 
| Al Horford (26)
| Darius Bazley (10)
| Hamidou Diallo (10)
| Chesapeake Energy Arena0
| 9–12
|-style="background:#cfc;"
| 22
| February 6
| Minnesota
| 
| Shai Gilgeous-Alexander (31)
| Gilgeous-Alexander, Williams (9)
| Shai Gilgeous-Alexander (7)
| Chesapeake Energy Arena0
| 10–12
|-style="background:#fcc;"
| 23
| February 8
| @ L. A. Lakers
| 
| Shai Gilgeous-Alexander (29)
| Darius Bazley (16)
| Shai Gilgeous-Alexander (10)
| Staples Center0
| 10–13
|-style="background:#fcc;"
| 24
| February 10
| @ L. A. Lakers
| 
| Al Horford (25)
| Hamidou Diallo (13)
| Al Horford (28)
| Staples Center0
| 10–14
|-style="background:#fcc;"
| 25
| February 12
| @ Denver
| 
| Justin Jackson (20)
| Kenrich Williams (11)
| Kenrich Williams (9)
| Ball Arena0
| 10–15
|-style="background:#cfc;"
| 26
| February 14
| Milwaukee
| 
| Al Horford (20)
| Hamidou Diallo (13)
| Al Horford (9)
| Chesapeake Energy Arena0
| 11–15
|-style="background:#fcc;"
| 27
| February 16
| Portland
| 
| Luguentz Dort (23)
| Isaiah Roby (10)
| Darius Bazley (6)
| Chesapeake Energy Arena  0
| 11–16
|-style="background:#fcc;"
| 28
| February 17
| @ Memphis
| 
| Shai Gilgeous-Alexander (22)
| Isaiah Roby (8)
| Shai Gilgeous-Alexander (6)
| FedEx Forum0
| 11–17
|-style="background:#fcc;"
| 29
| February 19
| @ Milwaukee
| 
| Luguentz Dort (17)
| Muscala, Roby (7)
| Shai Gilgeous-Alexander (5)
| Fiserv Forum750
| 11–18
|-style="background:#cfc;"
| 30
| February 21
| Cleveland
| 
| Shai Gilgeous-Alexander (31)
| Al Horford (8)
| Shai Gilgeous-Alexander (9)
| Rocket Mortgage FieldHouse2,720
| 12–18
|-style="background:#fcc;"
| 31
| February 22
| Miami
| 
| Shai Gilgeous-Alexander (27)
| Dort, Williams (7)
| Gilgeous-Alexander, Maledon (7)
| Chesapeake Energy Arena0
| 12–19
|-style="background:#cfc;"
| 32
| February 24
| San Antonio
| 
| Shai Gilgeous-Alexander (42)
| Darius Bazley (10)
| Al Horford (7)
| Chesapeake Energy Arena0
| 13–19
|-style="background:#cfc;"
| 33
| February 26
| Atlanta
| 
| Shai Gilgeous-Alexander (24)
| Darius Bazley (12)
| Theo Maledon (7)
| Chesapeake Energy Arena0
| 14–19
|-style="background:#fcc;"
| 34
| February 27
| Denver
| 
| Darius Bazley (22)
| Isaiah Roby (9)
| Isaiah Roby (7)
| Chesapeake Energy Arena0
| 14–20

|-style="background:#fcc;"
| 35
| March 3
| Dallas
| 
| Shai Gilgeous-Alexander (15)
| Darius Bazley (10)
| Shai Gilgeous-Alexander (3)
| American Airlines Center3,508
| 14–21
|-style="background:#cfc;"
| 36
| March 4
| @ San Antonio
| 
| Shai Gilgeous-Alexander (33)
| Darius Bazley (10)
| Shai Gilgeous-Alexander (8)
| AT&T Center1,000
| 15–21
|-style="background:#cfc;"
| 37
| March 11
| Dallas
| 
| Shai Gilgeous-Alexander (32)
| Moses Brown (12)
| Theo Maledon (9)
| Chesapeake Energy Arena0
| 16–21
|-style="background:#fcc;"
| 38
| March 13
| New York
| 
| Al Horford (16)
| Moses Brown (9)
| Dort & Jerome (9)
| Chesapeake Energy Arena0
| 16–22
|-style="background:#cfc;"
| 39
| March 14
| Memphis
| 
| Shai Gilgeous-Alexander (30)
| Aleksej Pokusevski (10)
| Jerome & Gilgeous-Alexander (5)
| Chesapeake Energy Arena0
| 17–22
|-style="background:#fcc;"
| 40
| March 16
| @ Chicago
| 
| Shai Gilgeous-Alexander (21)
| Moses Brown (16)
| Kenrich Williams (4)
| United Center0
| 17–23
|-style="background:#fcc;"
| 41
| March 18
| @ Atlanta
| 
| Shai Gilgeous-Alexander (19)
| Isaiah Roby (8)
| Theo Maledon (5)
| State Farm Arena2,621
| 17–24
|-style="background:#cfc;"
| 42
| March 21
| @ Houston
| 
| Luguentz Dort (23)
| Moses Brown (14)
| Ty Jerome (5)
| Toyota Center3,297
| 18–24
|-style="background:#cfc;"
| 43
| March 22
| @ Minnesota
| 
| Shai Gilgeous-Alexander (31)
| Moses Brown (18)
| Ty Jerome (6)
| Target Center0
| 19–24
|-style="background:#fcc;"
| 44
| March 24
| Memphis
| 
| Moses Brown (19)
| Moses Brown (12)
| Al Horford (6)
| Chesapeake Energy Arena0
| 19–25
|-style="background:#fcc;"
| 45
| March 27
| Boston
| 
| Theo Maledon (22)
| Moses Brown (23)
| Aleksej Pokuševski (5)
| Chesapeake Energy Arena0
| 19–26
|-style="background:#fcc;"
| 46
| March 29
| Dallas
| 
| Aleksej Pokuševski (21)
| Brown, Roby (9)
| Ty Jerome (5)
| Chesapeake Energy Arena0
| 19–27
|-style="background:#cfc;"
| 47
| March 31
| Toronto
| 
| Svi Mykhailiuk (22)
| Moses Brown (12)
| Theo Maledon (6)
| Chesapeake Energy Arena0
| 20–27

|-style="background:#fcc;"
| 48
| April 2
| @ Phoenix
| 
| Theo Maledon (33)
| Moses Brown (7)
| Aleksej Pokuševski (4)
| Phoenix Suns Arena3,422
| 20–28
|-style="background:#fcc;"
| 49
| April 3
| @ Portland
| 
| Kenrich Williams (18)
| Moses Brown (14)
| Jerome & Pokuševski (4)
| Moda Center0
| 20–29
|-style="background:#fcc;"
| 50
| April 5
| Detroit
| 
| Aleksej Pokuševski (19)
| Tony Bradley (9)
| Ty Jerome (5)
| Chesapeake Energy Arena0
| 20–30
|-style="background:#fcc;"
| 51
| April 7
| Charlotte
| 
| Jalen McDaniels (21)
| Cody Zeller (14)
| Brad Wanamaker (6)
| Chesapeake Energy Arena0
| 20–31
|-style="background:#fcc;"
| 52
| April 8
| Cleveland
| 
| Ty Jerome (23)
| Moses Brown(11)
| Kenrich Williams (9)
| Chesapeake Energy Arena0
| 20–32
|-style="background:#fcc;"
| 53
| April 10
| Philadelphia
| 
| Darius Bazley (17)
| Tony Bradley (14)
| Bazley, Jerome, Maledon (5)
| Chesapeake Energy Arena0
| 20–33
|-style="background:#fcc;"
| 54
| April 13
| @ Utah
| 
| Luguentz Dort (42)
| Moses Brown (15)
| Luguentz Dort (3)
| Vivint Arena5,546
| 20–34
|-style="background:#fcc;"
| 55
| April 14
| Golden State
| 
| Darius Bazley (22)
| Moses Brown (12)
| Theo Maledon (5)
| Chesapeake Energy Arena0
| 20–35
|-style="background:#fcc;"
| 56
| April 16
| @ Detroit
| 
| Luguentz Dort (26)
| Moses Brown (8)
| Kenrich Williams (4)
| Little Caesars Arena750
| 20–36
|-style="background:#fcc;"
| 57
| April 18
| @ Toronto
| 
| Luguentz Dort (29)
| Bazley, Roby (8)
| Ty Jerome (6)
| Amalie ArenaLimited seating
| 20–37
|-style="background:#fcc;"
| 58
| April 19
| @ Washington
| 
| Darius Bazley (20)
| Bazley, Maledon, Williams (7)
| Maledon, Pokuševski (5)
| Capital One Arena0
| 20–38
|-style="background:#fcc;"
| 59
| April 21
| @ Indiana
| 
| Darius Bazley (26)
| Moses Brown (11)
| Theo Maledon (7)
| Bankers Life Fieldhouse0
| 20–39
|-style="background:#fcc;"
| 60
| April 23
| Washington
| 
| Bazley, Maledon (20)
| Dort, Roby (8)
| Theo Maledon (8)
| Chesapeake Energy Arena0
| 20–40
|-style="background:#fcc;"
| 61
| April 26
| @ Philadelphia
| 
| Ty Jerome (22)
| Brown, Roby (8)
| Aleksej Pokuševski (5)
| Wells Fargo Center4,094
| 20–41
|-style="background:#cfc;"
| 62
| April 27
| @ Boston
| 
| Luguentz Dort (24)
| Darius Bazley (10)
| Theo Maledon (5)
| TD Garden2,298
| 21–41
|-style="background:#fcc;"
| 63
| April 29
| New Orleans
| 
| Luguentz Dort (17)
| Moses Brown (18)
| Theo Maledon (4)
| Chesapeake Energy Arena0
| 21–42

|-style="background:#fcc;"
| 64
| May 1
| Indiana
| 
| Moses Brown (16)
| Gabriel Deck (5)
| Hall, Williams (4)
| Chesapeake Energy Arena0
| 21–43
|-style="background:#fcc;"
| 65
| May 2
| Phoenix
| 
| Darius Bazley (19)
| Darius Bazley (9)
| Ty Jerome (5)
| Chesapeake Energy Arena0
| 21–44
|-style="background:#fcc;"
| 66
| May 4
| Sacramento
| 
| Darius Bazley (24)
| Moses Brown (17)
| Dort, Jerome (4)
| Chesapeake Energy Arena0
| 21–45
|-style="background:#fcc;"
| 67
| May 6
| @ Golden State
| 
| Ty Jerome (23)
| Moses Brown (8)
| Theo Maledon (8)
| Chase Center3,621
| 21–46
|-style="background:#fcc;"
| 68
| May 8
| @ Golden State
| 
| Sviatoslav Mykhailiuk (17)
| Moses Brown (8)
| Kenrich Williams (5)
| Chase Center4,155
| 21–47
|-style="background:#fcc;"
| 69
| May 9
| @ Sacramento
| 
| Darius Bazley (18)
| Moses Brown (8)
| Aleksej Pokuševski (5)
| Golden 1 Center0
| 21–48
|-style="background:#fcc;"
| 70
| May 11
| @ Sacramento
| 
| Kenrich Williams (20)
| Moses Brown (13)
| Hoard, Williams (4)
| Golden 1 Center0
| 21–49
|-style="background:#fcc;"
| 71
| May 14
| Utah
| 
| Sviatoslav Mykhailiuk (19)
| Aleksej Pokuševski (9)
| Tony Bradley, Maledon (3)
| Chesapeake Energy Arena0
| 21–50
|-style="background:#cfc;"
| 72
| May 16
| L. A. Clippers
| 
| Aleksej Pokuševski (29)
| Moses Brown (18)
| Theo Maledon (4)
| Chesapeake Energy Arena0
| 22–50

Player statistics

Regular season

 Led team in statistic
After all games.
‡ Waived during the season
† Traded during the season
≠ Acquired during the season

Individual game highs

Transactions

Overview

Trades

Free agency

Re-signed

Additions

Subtractions

References

Oklahoma City Thunder seasons
Oklahoma City Thunder
Oklahoma City Thunder
Oklahoma City Thunder